Peterborough is a borough constituency represented in the House of Commons of the Parliament of the United Kingdom. Its current form is the direct, unbroken successor of a smaller constituency that was created in the mid-16th century and used for the legislatures of England, Great Britain and the United Kingdom (UK). The seat today elects one Member of Parliament (MP) by the first-past-the-post system of election since 1885, before which its earlier form had two-member representation using the similar bloc vote system and both forms had a broadening but restricted franchise until 1918.

The current MP is Paul Bristow of the Conservative Party, who was elected at the 2019 general election.

Boundaries and boundary changes

The City of Peterborough formed a parliamentary borough returning two members in 1541. The rest of the Soke of Peterborough was part of the Northamptonshire parliamentary county; the area south of the River Nene was in the historic county of Huntingdonshire and Thorney was considered part of Cambridgeshire. Until 1832 when the whole of the parish of Saint John the Baptist was encompassed, the boundary, as far as is known, excluded the villages of Longthorpe, Dogsthorpe and Newark with Eastfield. The Great Reform Act did not affect the borough, while the rural portion of the Soke was included in the Northern division of Northamptonshire. Under the Boundaries Act 1868, New Fletton and Woodstone were transferred from Huntingdonshire and, under the Redistribution of Seats Act 1885, the borough's representation was reduced from two to one MP.

In 1918 the parliamentary borough was abolished and replaced with a new division of the parliamentary county of Northampton with the Soke of Peterborough,
including the whole of the Soke (which had been created as a separate administrative county by the Local Government Act 1888) and neighbouring parts of the administrative county of Northamptonshire, absorbing the bulk of the abolished Northern division, incorporating Oundle and extending down to and beyond Thrapston and Corby. This became a county constituency under the revisions brought in for the 1950 general election by the Representation of the People Act 1948, with only minor changes to the boundaries of the constituency to reflect a rationalisation of the rural districts of Northamptonshire.

The composition of the constituency from 1918 onwards is shown in the table below.

In 1965 the administrative counties of the Soke of Peterborough and Huntingdonshire were combined to form Huntingdon and Peterborough. At the next redistribution, which came into effect for the February 1974 general election, the constituency was redesignated as a Borough Constituency, composed of the local authorities which had comprised the Soke, together with the small Rural District of Thorney, which was transferred from the administrative county/county constituency of Isle of Ely.  The parts in Northamptonshire were transferred to the county constituency of Wellingborough.

Meanwhile, as a result of the Local Government Act 1972, the two counties of Huntingdon and Peterborough and Cambridgeshire and Isle of Ely were merged to form the non-metropolitan county of Cambridgeshire, with effect from 1 April 1974. However, the next redistribution did not come into effect until the 1983 general election, when areas to the south of the River Nene, including Fletton and the Ortons, which were now part of the expanded City of Peterborough, were transferred from the abolished County Constituency of Huntingdonshire. Mainly rural areas to the east (Thorney and Eye) and west (Barnack and Werrington) were transferred respectively to the new County Constituencies of North East Cambridgeshire and Huntingdon.

The next redistribution, which came into effect for the 1997 general election, saw the creation of the County Constituency of North West Cambridgeshire, which took the areas to the south of the River Nene (City of Peterborough wards of Fletton, Orton Longueville, Orton Waterville and Stanground). Werrington was transferred back from the Huntingdon constituency. Following their review of parliamentary representation in Cambridgeshire in 2005, the Boundary Commission for England made minor alterations to the existing constituencies to deal with population changes, including the transfer back of Thorney and Eye from North East Cambridgeshire. There were also marginal changes to take account of the redistribution of City of Peterborough wards. These changes increased the electorate from 64,893 to 70,640. On the enumeration date of 17 February 2000, the electoral quota for England was 69,934 voters per constituency.

The current constituency is composed of built-up areas of Peterborough to the north of the River Nene, as well as rural areas to the east and north and comprises approximately 60% of the electorate of the local authority of the City of Peterborough. Remaining parts of the city, composed of residential areas to the south of the River Nene and rural areas to the west of Peterborough (wards of Barnack, Fletton, Glinton and Wittering, Northborough, Orton Longueville, Orton Waterville, Orton with Hampton, Stanground Central, and Stanground East) form part of the North West Cambridgeshire constituency.

Franchise

In the unreformed House of Commons to be either a candidate or an elector for a county seat, a man had to own (not rent) freehold property valued for the land tax at two pounds a year (women could neither vote nor stand for election). They were known as the Forty Shilling Freeholders. The franchise for borough seats varied enormously. Originally in Peterborough the dean and chapter had claimed the franchise and held that only residents of Minster Precincts were burgesses. By the interregnum, the city was one of 37 boroughs in which suffrage was restricted to those paying scot and lot, a form of municipal taxation. In 1800 there were 2,000 registered voters in Northamptonshire and 400 in Peterborough. By 1835 this was 576, or about one per cent of the population. Bribery was general until the introduction of the secret ballot under the Ballot Act 1872. Votes were cast by spoken declaration, in public, at the hustings, erected on the Market Place (now Cathedral Square).

In 1832 the Great Reform Act enfranchised those who owned or leased land worth £10 or more and the Second Reform Act extended this to all householders paying £10 or more in rent per annum, effectively enfranchising the skilled working class, so by 1868 the percentage of voters in Peterborough had risen to about 20% of the population. The Third Reform Act extended the provisions of the previous act to the counties and the Fourth Reform Act widened suffrage further by abolishing practically all property qualifications for men and by enfranchising women over 30 who met minimum property qualifications. This system, known as universal manhood suffrage, was first used in the 1918 general election. However, full electoral equality would not occur until the Fifth Reform Act ten years later.

According to the 2001 census, the population count of Peterborough constituency is 95,103 persons, comprising 46,131 males and 48,972 females. 67.56% of those aged 16–74 are economically active, including 5.92% unemployed; a further 12.26% are retired and 3.08% students. Of a total 39,760 households, 63.80% are owner occupied, fewer than the regional (72.71%) and national (68.72%) averages. Turnout at the 2005 general election was 41,194 or 61.0% of those eligible to vote, below the regional (63.6%) and national (61.3%) figures.

Members of Parliament

Peterborough sent two members to parliament for the first time in 1547. Before the civil war, many were relatives of the clergy; then for two hundred years after the restoration there was always a Fitzwilliam, or a Fitzwilliam nominee, sitting as member for Peterborough, making it a Whig stronghold. Representation was reduced to one member under the Redistribution of Seats Act 1885.

One of the earliest incumbents, Sir Walter Mildmay, member for Peterborough from 1553 to 1554, subsequently became Chancellor of the Exchequer from 1559 to 1589. Later, in the nineteenth century, William Elliot, Whig member from 1802 until his death in 1819, was Chief Secretary to the Lord Lieutenant of Ireland between 1806 and 1807; the Hon. William Lamb (later the 2nd Viscount Melbourne), Whig member from 1816 to 1819, became Home Secretary in 1830 then Prime Minister from 1834 to 1841; and Sir James Scarlett (later the 1st Baron Abinger), Whig member from 1819 to 1830, was, from 1827, Attorney General for England and Wales.

From the formal merger of the breakaway Liberal Unionists with the Conservatives in 1912 and the absorption of rural North Northamptonshire in 1918, Peterborough has been predominantly Conservative; however, it has elected Labour MPs several times from 1929 onwards.

Lord Burghley, as he then was, succeeded the socialist writer and illustrator, Frank Horrabin, who was born in the city and elected under the leadership of Ramsay MacDonald in 1929. David Cecil, 6th Marquess of Exeter, winner of 400m hurdles at the 1928 Summer Olympics, member of the International Olympic Committee for 48 years and chairman of the organising committee of the 1948 Summer Olympics, was the Conservative member from 1931 to 1943.

In 1966, in one of the closest polls in UK history, Sir Harmar Nicholls held the seat by three votes after seven recounts. Nicholls was the Conservative member from 1950 to 1974, when he lost in the October election of that year to Labour's Michael Ward, having held on by just 22 votes after four recounts in the election eight months earlier. The growth in the New Town from 1967 may in part account for Labour's victory here in 1974. In 1979, however, Ward lost the seat to the Conservative Brian Mawhinney, who would represent Peterborough for the entire duration of the incoming Conservative government and was a Cabinet Minister and Conservative Party Chairman during the second Major government (1992–97).

The seat was made more competitive in the 1997 boundary review by the formation of the North West Cambridgeshire seat, which incorporated the rural land outside Peterborough and several Conservative-inclined wards from the city. Since its formation, North West Cambridgeshire has been one of the safest Conservative seats in the country, whilst Peterborough was ranked 93rd in the Conservatives's one hundred most vulnerable seats (the ones which the other parties must take if there is to be a change of government) and 73rd on Labour's target list; these factors led Mawhinney to stand in North West Cambridgeshire instead.  He retired as an MP in 2005 and was created Baron Mawhinney, of Peterborough in the county of Cambridgeshire.

Helen Clark (née Brinton) won the seat for Labour in 1997. She was defeated by Conservative candidate Stewart Jackson at the 2005 election, following which it was widely reported that Clark was planning to defect to the Conservative Party, an announcement which was not popular locally. However, by early June it emerged that while she had left the Labour Party, she had not in fact joined the Conservatives and did not intend to.

Jackson was re-elected in 2010 with an increased majority, which then fell in 2015. In 2017, Labour's Fiona Onasanya won a majority of 607; this result marked the first time since 1929 that Peterborough voted Labour in an election where the Conservatives won the national popular vote, and the first time it has ever elected a Labour MP in a year in which Labour did not form the government. Furthermore, Peterborough became one of five constituencies – the others being Croydon Central, Enfield Southgate, Leeds North West and Reading East – which elected Labour MPs in 2017 having not done so since 2001.

Parliamentary borough 1547–1918

MPs 1542–1660

MPs 1660–1883
The Tories (or Abhorrers) and Whigs (or Petitioners) originated in the Court and Country parties that emerged in the aftermath of the civil war, although it is more accurate to describe them as loose tendencies, both of which might be regarded as conservative in modern terms. Modern party politics did not really begin to coalesce in Great Britain until at least 1784.

MPs 1885–1918
In 1832 the Tory Party evolved into the Conservative Party and in 1859 the Whig Party evolved, with Radicals and Peelites, into the Liberal Party. In opposition to Irish home rule, the Liberal Unionists ceded from the Liberals in 1886, aligning themselves with the Conservatives. The Labour Party was later founded, as the Labour Representation Committee, in 1900.

Division and county constituency
The parliamentary borough of Peterborough was abolished under the Representation of the People Act 1918, and the name was transferred to a division of the new parliamentary county of Northampton with the Soke of Peterborough. The Peterborough division became a county constituency in 1950.

MPs 1918–1974

Borough constituency
Peterborough was redefined as a borough constituency with effect from the February 1974 general election. Successors of the historic parliamentary boroughs, the spending limits for election campaigns are slightly lower than in county constituencies.

MPs since 1974

Onasanya sat as an independent after she was suspended by the Labour Party in December 2018. The seat became vacant on 1 May 2019 following a successful recall petition, until 7 June 2019, when Lisa Forbes was elected to the constituency in the 2019 Peterborough by-election, on behalf of the Labour Party.

Elections

Elections in the 2020's

Elections in the 2010s

Elections in the 2000s

Elections in the 1990s

Elections in the 1980s

Elections in the 1970s

Elections in the 1960s

Elections in the 1950s

Elections in the 1940s

General Election 1939–40
Another general election was required to take place before the end of 1940. The political parties had been making preparations for an election to take place from 1939 and by the end of this year, the following candidates had been selected:
Conservative: David Cecil
Labour: Samuel Bennett

Elections in the 1930s

Elections in the 1920s

Elections in the 1910s

Elections in the 1900s

Elections in the 1890s

Elections in the 1880s

 Caused by Wentworth-Fitzwilliam's death.

 Caused by Whalley's resignation.

Elections in the 1870s

 Caused by Whalley's death. Raper was a 'Permissive Bill' candidate.

Elections in the 1860s

 

 

 Green, a Radical liberal, withdrew before polling.

Elections in the 1850s

  

  
  

  

 Caused by the 1852 by-election being declared void on petition due to bribery and treating. Although Whalley secured the most votes, his election was declared void owing to disqualification due to the earlier bribery and treating, and Hankey was declared elected.

  

 Caused by Watson's death.

Elections in the 1840s

Elections in the 1830s

  
  

  
  

  
  

  
  

  

 Caused by Wentworth-FitzWilliam's resignation

See also
List of parliamentary constituencies in Cambridgeshire

References

External links
United Kingdom Parliament

Parliamentary constituencies in Cambridgeshire
Parliamentary constituencies in Northamptonshire (historic)
Politics of Peterborough
Constituencies of the Parliament of the United Kingdom established in 1541